Stranraer in Wigtownshire was a royal burgh that returned one commissioner to the Parliament of Scotland and to the Convention of Estates.

After the Acts of Union 1707, Stranraer, New Galloway, Whithorn and Wigtown formed the Wigtown district of burghs, returning one member between them to the House of Commons of Great Britain.

List of burgh commissioners

 1685–86: Peter Paterson, provost  
 1689 (convention), 1689: John Dalrymple the younger of Stair (took public office, 1689) 
 1690–1701: Sir Patrick Murray  
 1702–07: George Dalrymple (son of Viscount Stair)

See also
 List of constituencies in the Parliament of Scotland at the time of the Union

References

Constituencies of the Parliament of Scotland (to 1707)
Constituencies disestablished in 1707
1707 disestablishments in Scotland
Politics of Dumfries and Galloway
History of Dumfries and Galloway
Stranraer